The 1869 Costa Rican presidential election took place while the dictator Jesús Jiménez Zamora was in power after the coup against José María Castro Madriz, whose constitutional term was unable to finish. Jiménez Zamora was the sole candidate, during his government he repressed the press and his political opponents. The 1869 Constitution only allowed men over 25 years old owners of a property that had a value higher than 200 pesos to vote.

References

Elections in Costa Rica
1869 elections in Central America
Single-candidate elections
1869 in Costa Rica